Sjaak Roggeveen (born 5 October 1942) is a Dutch former international footballer who played for a number of clubs in his native Netherlands. He featured three times for the Netherlands national football team in 1969, scoring three goals.

Career statistics

International

International goals
Scores and results list the Netherlands' goal tally first.

References

1942 births
Living people
Dutch footballers
Netherlands international footballers
Association football forwards
DHC Delft players
ADO Den Haag players
Excelsior Rotterdam players